Nikita Vasilyevich Salamatov (born 23 February 1994) is a Russian football player. He plays for FC Znamya Noginsk.

Club career
He made his professional debut in the Russian Professional Football League for FC Khimki on 12 July 2014 in a game against FC Spartak Kostroma.

He made his Russian Football National League debut for FC Zenit-2 Saint Petersburg on 12 March 2016 in a game against FC Volgar Astrakhan.

He made his Russian Premier League debut for FC Tambov on 4 July 2020 in a game against FC Spartak Moscow, replacing Vladimir Obukhov in the added time.

References

External links
 
 
 

1994 births
Footballers from Moscow
Living people
Russian footballers
Russia youth international footballers
Russia under-21 international footballers
Association football midfielders
FC Moscow players
FC Khimki players
FC SKA Rostov-on-Don players
FC Lokomotiv Moscow players
FC Tyumen players
FC Zenit-2 Saint Petersburg players
PFC Sochi players
FC Luch Vladivostok players
FC Tambov players
FC Irtysh Omsk players
FC Vityaz Podolsk players
FC Spartak Kostroma players
Russian Premier League players
Russian First League players
Russian Second League players
Competitors at the 2019 Summer Universiade